Mariangela Pino is an American actress. She is best known for her role as Diane Koscinski in the 1994 film Richie Rich and her recurring role as Marie Morton on the sitcom Home Improvement.

Pino earned a Bachelor of Arts in Communications from Temple University and a Master of Fine Arts in Performance Art from the University of California, San Diego.

In 1986, Pino appeared in the Off-Broadway play Orchards.

Other television credits include Wiseguy, Who's the Boss?, L.A. Law, Murder One, Chicago Hope, ER, NYPD Blue and The Pretender.

In April 1996, Pino had a bit part in a made-for-TV movie, Unforgivable, co-starring with John Ritter and Harley Jane Kozak.

Pino also appeared in the films Op Center (1995), The Souler Opposite and Living Out Loud, both released in 1998.

Her last acting credit was a guest appearance on Touched by an Angel in 1999.

She currently runs "The Center for True North" with her husband Hank Landau in Springdale, Utah.

References

External links

The Center for True North

1953 births
20th-century American actresses
Actresses from New Mexico
American film actresses
American stage actresses
American television actresses
Living people
People from Rio Arriba County, New Mexico
21st-century American women
Temple University alumni
University of California, San Diego alumni